Greatest Hits is a compilation album by American pop rock band the Bangles. It was released by their record company, Columbia Records on May 8, 1990, to fulfill the band's contractual requirements; by the time of the release of the album, the group had already broken up. The album peaked at #97 on the US Billboard 200 and at #4 in the UK Albums Chart.

Content
The album features the single remixes of "Hero Takes a Fall", "Walking Down Your Street" and "I'll Set You Free". It also includes the group's cover of Simon & Garfunkel's "Hazy Shade of Winter", which was released on the soundtrack of the film Less than Zero, and had not been included on a Bangles album. It also contains the non-album B-side cover of The Grass Roots' "Where Were You When I Needed You" and the previously unreleased song "Everything I Wanted" from the Everything album sessions. "Everything I Wanted" was released as a single in the Netherlands and Australia to promote the release. In the UK, a new remix of "Walk Like an Egyptian" was released instead, peaking at #73.

Track listing
Tracks are included in chronological order by album, except the last track.

Band members

The Bangles
Susanna Hoffs – rhythm guitar, percussion, vocals
Vicki Peterson – lead guitar, mandolin, electric sitar, vocals
Michael Steele – bass guitar, acoustic guitar, vocals 
Debbi Peterson – drums, percussion, vocals

Additional musicians
Rusty Anderson – additional guitars
Barbara Chapman – harp, additional guitars
Mitchell Froom, David Kahne – keyboards
Darryl Citizen – "noise"
Paulinho da Costa – percussion
Bobby Donati, Vinnie Vincent – guitars
Tommy Morgan – harmonica
Jim Snodgrass – tabla
David Lindley – guitars, bouzouki, saxophone, Dobro, multi-instruments
Walker Igleheart, John Philip Shenale, David White – keyboards, programming

Charts

Weekly charts

Year-end charts

Certifications

References

External links
 The Bangles official website

1990 greatest hits albums
The Bangles albums
Albums produced by David Kahne
Albums produced by Rick Rubin
Columbia Records compilation albums